The greater dwarf shrew (Suncus lixa) is a species of mammal in the family Soricidae. It is found in Angola, Botswana, Democratic Republic of the Congo, Kenya, Malawi, Namibia, Tanzania, Zambia, and Zimbabwe. Its natural habitats are subtropical or tropical dry forests and dry savanna. It is present in several protected areas, including the Kruger National Park. The main threat to greater dwarf shrews is the loss or degradation of moist, productive areas such as wetlands and rank grasslands within suitable habitat.

References

Simelane, Felicity Nonsimiso, et al. “Habitat Associations of Small Mammals in the Foothills of the Drakensberg Mountains, South Africa.” De Gruyter, De Gruyter, 23 Feb. 2018, Habitat Associations of Small Mammals in the Foothills of the Drakensberg Mountains, South Africa.

Suncus
Taxonomy articles created by Polbot
Mammals described in 1898
Taxa named by Oldfield Thomas
Taxobox binomials not recognized by IUCN